Mossano is a frazione of the  comune of Barbarano Mossano in the province of Vicenza, Veneto, noerth-eastern Italy. It is west of SP247 provincial road.

References

External links
(Google Maps)

Cities and towns in Veneto